Coastal Dreams is a 24-episode online telenovela produced by NBC in 2007.

The series stars Danica Stewart, Tanee McCall, Elena Campbell-Martinez, Kam Heskin, Charlie Koznick, Ken Luckey, and Noah Schuffman.  It features two beautiful women named Zoe and Stacey, whose plans for fun on the beach is interrupted by deadly danger. The series is executive produced, written and created by Rick Draughon and directed by Mark Cole.

Zoe (Danica Stewart) needs to escape her Texas hometown after her boyfriend goes more than a little psycho on her. She packs up her bathing suit, grabs her best friend and fellow college grad Stacey and heads to California to visit her wealthy cousin April. Staying in April's seaside mansion seems to like the dream vacation, especially after the girls meet April's hot boyfriend Christian and the dreamy local deputy, Will. the worse quickly though when Zoe starts receiving menacing text messages from her ex...and the locals reveal their ulterior motives.

This show aired every Tuesday and Thursday at nbc.com.

Cast

Danica Stewart as Zoe: Hailing from Plano, Texas, budding jewelry designer Zoe is the girl we all knew in high school. You know, the beautiful, popular confident one with a heart of gold? When her boyfriend Sebastian started stalking her and even tried to kill her during their senior year of college - she just had to get out of Texas. Luckily, her favorite cousin April invited Zoe and her best friend Stacey to escape to her place in Pacific Shores, California for the summer.

Tanee McCall as Stacey: Zoe's lifelong best friend is Stacey, and she's had her entire future mapped out since she was a little girl. Wicked smart and maybe a little uptight, Stacey had had to work hard for everything in life, and plans on working her way through law school, which she's set to start in the fall. Stacey is thrilled to be spending her last summer away from the real world in Pacific Shores with Zoe, even though she'll have to find a job to afford it.

Kam Heskin as April: Ex-model and global businesswoman April has always thought of her cousin Zoe as more of a little sister than a cousin. Even though they spent every summer together as kids, April grew up worlds away, in the Fox family's sumptuous coastal mansion. Her world may seem fabulous on the outside, but April has endured a lot of hardship in life: her mother left when she was a baby, and her beloved father Gabriel died a few years ago, leaving her an orphan in charge of a billion-dollar fortune.

Charlie Koznick as Christian: Christian is a bit of a mystery man and a hot one at that. He rode the waves into Pacific Shores a few summers ago, with little more than the clothes on his back and a surfboard. Having enrolled in the oceanography program at the local college and made a good friend in Deputy Will Carpenter, Chris makes ends meet by working as a carpenter and handyman. He started doing odd jobs for April, and it wasn't long before they discovered they had a lot in common. But is April's cousin Zoe more Christian's speed?

Ken Luckey as Will: Born and bred in Pacific Shores, easy-going Will grew up idolizing his father, the town Police Chief. Following his dad into the family business, Will had to work hard to prove himself worthy of becoming a police officer. Most people in town think his father is a hard-ass, but Will's much more easygoing. Although he's done some dating amongst the locals, Will has yet to find the right woman for him and is beginning to doubt if she'll ever come along.

External links
Official site with episodes available online.

2007 telenovelas
American telenovelas
Television series by Universal Television
American drama web series